The 2016 Stockholm Open (also known as the 2016 If Stockholm Open due to sponsorship) was a professional men's tennis tournament played on indoor hard courts. It was the 48th edition of the tournament, and part of the ATP World Tour 250 series of the 2016 ATP World Tour. It took place at the Kungliga tennishallen in Stockholm, Sweden from 17 October until 23 October 2016. Unseeded Juan Martín del Potro, who entered the main draw on a wildcard, won the singles title.

Singles main-draw entrants

Seeds

 1 Rankings are as of October 10, 2016

Other entrants
The following players received wildcards into the singles main draw:
  Juan Martín del Potro 
  Elias Ymer 
  Mikael Ymer

The following players received entry from the qualifying draw:
  Ryan Harrison 
  Tobias Kamke 
  Adam Pavlásek 
  Jürgen Zopp

Withdrawals 
Before the tournament
  Daniel Evans →replaced by  Yūichi Sugita
  Lucas Pouille →replaced by  Dustin Brown

Doubles main-draw entrants

Seeds

 Rankings are as of October 10, 2016

Other entrants
The following pairs received wildcards into the doubles main draw:
  Isak Arvidsson /  Fred Simonsson
  Elias Ymer /  Mikael Ymer

Finals

Singles

  Juan Martín del Potro defeated  Jack Sock, 7–5, 6–1

Doubles

  Elias Ymer /  Mikael Ymer defeated  Mate Pavić /  Michael Venus, 6–1, 6–1

References

External links
 Official website